FAM114A2 (chromosome 5 open reading frame 3) is a gene on chromosome 5 in humans that encodes a protein FAM114A2. The protein function is not well known. FAM114A2 is, however, highly conserved in mammals with homologs both in fungi and plants.

Protein
The FAM114A2 protein is 505 amino acids long with a molecular weight of 55.5 kdal and an isoelectric point of 4.66. It is predicted to stay in the nucleus after translation 
There is evidence that c5orf3 interacts with another protein of unknown function from chromosome 5, c5orf4 
This protein is thought to include a P loop that suggests a role in ATP- and/or GTP-binding

Gene
The FAM114A2 gene is located on chromosome 5 (5q31-33). This gene has 14 exons spanning through its sequence. The coding sequence is 2886 base pairs with a 5’ UTR of 94 base pairs and a 3’ UTR of 1273 base pairs. It is expressed at high levels in most tissues of the human body. It is also highly expressed in tissues in the human brain

References

External links

Further reading